Legislative elections were held in Åland on 15 June 1957.

Results

References

Elections in Åland
Aland
1957 in Finland